The 1901 Auburn Tigers football team was an American football team that represented Auburn University as a member of the Southern Intercollegiate Athletic Association (SIAA) during the 1901 SIAA season. In its second season under head coach Walter H. Watkins, the team compiled a 2–3–1 record (2–2–1 against SIAA opponents).  It was the Tigers' tenth season of intercollegiate football.

Schedule

References

Auburn
Auburn Tigers football seasons
Auburn Tigers football